People of the World is a studio album by Jamaican reggae singer Burning Spear. It was released in 1986 via Slash Records. Recording sessions took place at Tuff Gong Recording Studio in Kingston. It was nominated for a Grammy Award for Best Reggae Recording at the 30th Annual Grammy Awards in 1988.

Track listing

Personnel
Winston Rodney – vocals, funde, harmony, producer
Anthony Bradshaw – backing vocals, rhythm guitar, funde, harmony
Richard Anthony Johnson – keyboards
Robert Lyn – Yamaha Clap Expander synthesizer
Lenford Richard – lead guitar
Devon Bradshaw – bass
Nelson Miller – drums, producer
Alvin Haughton – percussion
Jennifer Hill – saxophone
Dean Fraser – saxophone
Nilda Richards – trombone
Ronald "Nambo" Robinson – trombone
Pamela Fleming – trumpet
Junior "Chico" Chin – trumpet
Rass Brass – horn arrangement (tracks: 1–3, 5–6, 8–10)
Burning Brass – horn arrangement (tracks: 4, 7)
Mervyn Williams – recording
Michael Sauvage – mixing
Gary Sutherland – assistant engineering
Ron Victor – assistant engineering
Chris Bellman – mastering
Michael Hodgson – art direction & design
Scott Baldwin – illustration
Donna Cline – photography

References

External links

1986 albums
Burning Spear albums
Slash Records albums